The year 1779 in science and technology involved some significant events.

Astronomy
 March 23 – Edward Pigott discovers the Black Eye Galaxy (M64).
 May 5 – The spiral galaxy M61 is discovered in the constellation Virgo by Barnabus Oriani.

Exploration
 Horace-Bénédict de Saussure begins publication of Voyages dans les Alpes.

Mathematics
 Étienne Bézout publishes Théorie générale des équations algébriques in Paris, containing original work on elimination theory.

Physics
 Jean-Paul Marat publishes Découvertes de M. Marat sur le feu, l'électricité et la lumière (Discoveries of Mr Marat on Fire, Electricity and Light).

Technology
 January 8 – Bryan Higgins is granted a British patent for hydraulic cement (stucco) for use as an exterior plaster.
 May – Boulton and Watt’s Smethwick Engine is brought into service for pumping on the Birmingham Canal Navigations; two centuries later it will become the oldest working steam engine in the world.
 James Pickard first applies a crank and flywheel to a Newcomen atmospheric engine to produce circular motion.
 The Iron Bridge is erected across the River Severn in Shropshire, England; the first all-cast-iron bridge ever built. It will open to traffic on January 1, 1781.
 The spinning mule is perfected by the Lancashire inventor Samuel Crompton.
 The British Royal Navy adopts the carronade.
 The Girandoni Air Rifle is designed in Austria.

Births
 January 5 – General Zebulon Pike, American explorer (died 1813)
 May 1 – Alexander Morison, Scottish physician and psychiatrist (died 1866)
 August 7
 Jöns Jacob Berzelius, Swedish chemist (died 1848)
 Louis de Freycinet, French explorer of coastal regions of Western Australia (died 1842)

Deaths
 January 22 – Jeremiah Dixon, English surveyor and astronomer (born 1733)
 February 14 – James Cook, English explorer (born 1728)
 June 28 –  Martha Daniell Logan,  American botanist (born 1704)
 October 18 – Patrick d'Arcy, Irish-born mathematician (born 1725)
 November 16 – Pehr Kalm, Swedish botanist (born 1716)

References

 
18th century in science
1770s in science